Eero Erkko (18 May 1860, Orimattila - 14 October 1927) was a Finnish journalist and politician. He served as minister of social affairs from 27 November 1918 to 17 April 1919, minister of transport and public works from 17 April to 15 August 1919 and Minister of Trade and Industry from 15 August 1919 to 15 March 1920. He was a member of the Diet of Finland from 1894 to 1900 and again from 1905 to 1906 and of the Parliament of Finland from 1907 to 1919, representing the Young Finnish Party until 1918 and the National Progressive Party from 1918 to 1919. 

Erkko founded Päivälehti in 1889. He also edited the paper from 1890 to 1899. He was also the editor of Helsingin Sanomat (from 1908 to 1918 and again from 1920 until his death in 1927). He was the father of Eljas Erkko. He is buried in the Hietaniemi Cemetery in Helsinki.

References

External links
 

1860 births
1927 deaths
People from Orimattila
People from Uusimaa Province (Grand Duchy of Finland)
Young Finnish Party politicians
National Progressive Party (Finland) politicians
Ministers of Social Affairs of Finland
Ministers of Transport and Public Works of Finland
Ministers of Trade and Industry of Finland
Members of the Diet of Finland
Members of the Parliament of Finland (1907–08)
Members of the Parliament of Finland (1908–09)
Members of the Parliament of Finland (1909–10)
Members of the Parliament of Finland (1910–11)
Members of the Parliament of Finland (1911–13)
Members of the Parliament of Finland (1913–16)
Members of the Parliament of Finland (1916–17)
Members of the Parliament of Finland (1917–19)
Finnish journalists
European newspaper editors
Newspaper founders
People of the Finnish Civil War (White side)
Burials at Hietaniemi Cemetery